Boris Arkadievich Grigolashvili (Georgian: ბორის არკადის ძე გრიგოლაშვილი, October 26, 1933, Tbilisi – 29 October 1993, Kutaisi, buried in Tbilisi) was a Georgian military leader, major general (1993).

Graduated from the Tbilisi military school (1956). He served in the Armed Forces of the Soviet Union (1953–1989), held the rank of colonel (1980), and was awarded 3 orders and 14 medals of the USSR.

In the Georgian Armed Forces since 1992: chief of operations department (G-3) – first deputy chief of staff of the Main Directorate of the National Guard of Georgia, since July 1993 – chief of Staff – first deputy commander of the 1st army corps of the Ministry of Defense of Georgia.

He participated in military operations in Abkhazia  and Samachablo (Tskhinvali region). Many military operations were planned and successfully conducted under the leadership of B. Grigolashvili. He was mortally wounded and died in the fighting in the Abkhazian war. Major General Boris Grigolashvili was posthumously awarded the order of Vakhtang Gorgasali I class (1993) for his outstanding contribution to the benefit of the Motherland and the nation, for his steadfastness and self-sacrifice, for his bravery and heroism in the fight to protect the Motherland and its territorial integrity, for his skilful leadership, implementation of defense measures, development and conduct of military operations.

Literature 
 ენციკლოპედია „საქართველო“/ Encyclopedia "Georgia", vol. 2, p. 150, Tbilisi, 2012. http://georgianencyclopedia.ge/index.php?title=მთავარი_გვერდი
 ლევან დოლიძე "გენერალსიმუსი, მარშლები, გენერლები, ადმირალები – ჩვენი თანამემამულენი1700-2000" / Dolidze L. "Generalissimo, marshals, generals, admirals – our compatriots 1700-2000", pp. 111, 176, Tbilisi, Sezani, 2000. http://dspace.nplg.gov.ge/handle/1234/244300
 ლევან დოლიძე "გენერლები საქართველოდან"/ Dolidze L. "Generals from Georgia: Three-century chronicle of the Georgian generals", pp. 441, 659, Tbilisi, 2003. http://dspace.nplg.gov.ge/handle/1234/114120
 ბორის გრიგოლაშვილი — საქართველოს ბიოგრაფიული ლექსიკონი / Boris Grigolashvili – Georgian Biographical Dictionary. http://www.nplg.gov.ge/bios/ka/00002839/

1933 births
1993 deaths
Generals from Georgia (country)